Raymond Kreder (born 26 November 1989) is a Dutch professional road racing cyclist, who currently rides for UCI Continental team .

Kreder's older brother Michel Kreder and their cousin Wesley Kreder have also competed professionally as cyclists. Kreder was born, raised, and resides in The Hague, South Holland, Netherlands.

Major results
Sources:

2006
 1st Paris–Roubaix Juniors
2008
 2nd Scratch race, National Track Championships
2009
 1st  Points classification, Cascade Cycling Classic
 1st  Mountains classification, Tour de Beauce
 8th Overall Olympia's Tour
2010
 1st  Points race, National Track Championships
 1st Stage 3 Cascade Cycling Classic
 7th Ronde Van Vlaanderen Beloften
 7th Binche–Tournai–Binche
 10th Paris–Roubaix Espoirs
2011
 7th Ronde van Midden-Nederland
2012
 National Track Championships
1st  Madison (with Michel Kreder)
2nd Points race
 1st Stage 2 Tour of Norway
 3rd ProRace Berlin
2013
 6th ProRace Berlin
 7th RideLondon–Surrey Classic
2014
 1st ProRace Berlin
 1st Stage 1 Tour de l'Ain
 10th Vattenfall Cyclassics
2015
 4th Grand Prix de Denain
 4th Omloop van het Houtland
 6th Trofeo Playa de Palma
 6th Trofeo Santanyi-Ses Salines-Campos
 8th Grand Prix Impanis-Van Petegem
 9th Kuurne–Brussels–Kuurne
2016
 3rd Kampioenschap van Vlaanderen
 4th Ronde van Drenthe
 6th Clásica de Almería
2017
 3rd Dorpenomloop Rucphen
 5th Trofeo Porreres-Felanitx-Ses Salines-Campos
 5th Trofeo Playa de Palma
 9th Clásica de Almería
2018
 1st  Points classification, Tour of Hainan
 1st Stage 1 Tour of Thailand
 2nd Overall Tour de Tochigi
1st  Points classification
1st Stage 3
 5th Overall Tour de Korea
1st  Points classification
1st Stage 5
2019
 1st  Overall Tour de Tochigi
1st  Points classification
1st Stage 3
 1st Stage 4 Tour of Japan
 1st Stage 3 Tour de Hokkaido
 3rd Overall Tour de Korea
1st Stage 1
2022
 1st Stage 4 Tour of Japan
 5th Overall Tour de Taiwan
 1st Stage 4
 3rd Overall Tour of Thailand

References

External links

1989 births
Living people
Dutch male cyclists
People from Zuidplas
UCI Road World Championships cyclists for the Netherlands
Sportspeople from South Holland
20th-century Dutch people
21st-century Dutch people